Duck coronavirus 2714 is a species of coronavirus in the genus Gammacoronavirus.

References

Gammacoronaviruses